Chen Muhua (born 4 December 1973) is a Chinese sport shooter who competed in the 1996 Summer Olympics.

References

1973 births
Living people
Chinese female sport shooters
ISSF rifle shooters
Olympic shooters of China
Shooters at the 1996 Summer Olympics
Shooters at the 1994 Asian Games
Place of birth missing (living people)
Asian Games medalists in shooting
Asian Games silver medalists for China
Medalists at the 1994 Asian Games
20th-century Chinese women